Chäserrugg (or Käserrugg) is a mountain in  Wildhaus-Alt St. Johann municipality, Toggenburg, canton of St. Gallen, Switzerland, rising to 2,262 m.
It is the easternmost of the "seven peaks" of the Churfirsten, the other six being, running east to west,  Hinterrugg (2,306 m), 
Schibenstoll (2,234 m), Zuestoll (2,235 m), Brisi (2,279 m), Frümsel (2,263 m), Selun (2,205 m).

In spite of its being counted among the "seven peaks", it has a modest prominence of just 14 m, forming part of the ridge ascending to Hinterrugg. 
Part of Toggenburg's ski resort, it is reached from Unterwasser (911 m) by Iltiosbahn, a funicular opened 1934 to Iltios (1,339 m), and from there by aerial lift (opened 1972).

References

External links 

  http://www.chaeserrugg.ch/

Mountains of the Alps
Mountains of Switzerland
Mountains of the canton of St. Gallen
Appenzell Alps